Rapes of Serbian women in late 1944 and early 1945 are rapes committed by The Red Army soldiers during their advancing to Berlin through Serbia during the Second World War.

Soviets during liberation of Belgrade 
Milovan Đilas spoke about these events at the end of World War II in his memoirs. The Germans began to retreat, and mass rapes by members of the Soviet Union army began. There was also a case where the mother-in-law was killed because she did not want to free the bed for the rape of her daughter-in-law. Soviet soldiers were repeatedly breaking into apartments and houses in Belgrade and the surrounding area, and they were making decisions on which soldier would rape the daughter and which would rape the mother. In order to avoid rape, women and girls hid in attics, sewers, holes in the ground, sheds and basements.

The situation was so bad that Tito requested a personal audience with Stalin through Milovan Đilas, asking him to stop the wave of rapes of Yugoslav women. Stalin, the head of the Kremlin at the time, told him: "Young guys are young guys, they've been through the war and they need a little rest." Jovanka Broz testifies to this, the testimony was written down by Senad Pećanin. Tito presented the problem to the head of the Soviet military mission, General Nikolai Korneyev, "in a very polite and relaxed way", in addition to the rape, he also complained about the banditry and arrogant behavior of the soldiers. However, Korneyev immediately began to protest about the "slander against the Soviet army". Stalin was also offended by the "slandering" of the Red Army by the Yugoslav allies and the conflict with Tito only deepened later. The same crimes took place in other liberated territories, and rapes of German, Polish, Lithuanian, Estonian, Latvian women are well known. It is estimated that the Soviets raped over 2 million women across Europe.

Serbian journalist Vuk Perišić said about the rapes: "The rapes were extremely brutal, under the influence of alcohol and usually by a group of soldiers. The Soviet soldiers did not pay attention to the fact that Serbia was their ally, and there is no doubt that the Soviet high command tacitly approved the rape."

According to Russian historian Nikita Bondarev, it was all propaganda and there were no mass rapes. About the crime, he says that it was not only the Soviets who raped, but also the Germans, the British and the Americans, and that there is no war without looting, banditry and abuse. He also states that the crimes of Soviet soldiers were greater in Germany and Austria than in the Balkans, because the Russian soldiers "were already tired and wanted to get revenge", so the percentage of rapes increased significantly.

Statistics 
The number of rapes, in a period of several months, taking into account that the Soviets passed only through the northeastern regions of Serbia and Vojvodina, speaks of the mass of these crimes. By the end of 1944 there were 1,219 rapes, 359 attempted rapes, 111 rapes with murder, and 248 rapes with attempted murder in Serbia. On the territory of Belgrade until 1945, over 2,000 rapes were reported. While the total number is estimated at over 5,000 thousand women and girls who have suffered sexual violence and abuse.

Research on sexual crimes on the territory of Serbia 
Estimating cases of sexual violence is extremely difficult, and various researchers have used different metrhods to arrive at widely differing estimates. Official estimates by Yugoslav authorities indicate that between 2,420 and 24,380 women bere abused by Red Army soldiers.

Evidence shows that Serbs and Yugoslavs were much less afraid of the Red Army than Austrians, Poles, Germans, Hungarians and Romanians. Soviet soldiers and officers reported that Bulgarians would call them "brothers". This can be most contrasted with the behavior of the Soviet troops in Romania, where they raped an estimated 355,200 women. Also, the number of raped women in Hungary varies from 50,000 to 500,000 according to different sources. In Austria, between 70,000 and 110,000 women were raped in Vienna alone.

Susan Brownsmiller noted that the liberation armies treated women in Serbia better than those in enemy countries.

Soviet propaganda about Serbia and Yugoslavia 
The pan-Slavic theme in the propaganda was intended to encourage Soviet soldiers to view the Serbs as a brotherly people. Soviet propaganda also drew the soldiers' attention to German crimes against Yugoslav and Serbian civilians with the aim of inciting hatred towards the Germans.

Tito asked Korneyev to immediately take measures to at least reduce incidents of robbery, rape and violence. Milovan Djilas stated that the complaints bore fruit and that the Soviet officers reacted more violently to the transgressions of their soldiers after the meeting with Korneyev and Stalin's participation.

The first factor

The second factor

See also 

 Research on the Soviet sexual crimes in Serbia during 1944-5
 Testimony of a Soviet Soldier

Literature 

 Slutskii, Zapiski, 127 and Catherine Merridale, Ivan's War: Life and Death in the Red Army, 1939-1945 (New York, 2006)
 Giinter Bischof, Austria in the First Cold War, 1945-55: The Leverage of the Weak (Basingstoke, 1999)
 James Mark, "Remembering Rapе"
 Krivosheev, ed, Rossiia i SSSR, 306.
 V.A. Zolotarev, et al. eds., Velikaia Otechestvennaia voina 1941- 1945godov: v dvenadtsati tomakh, vol. 3, Krasnaia Armiiav stranakh tsentral'noi, severnoi Evropy i na balkanakh: dokumenty i materially 1944-1945 (Moscow, 2000)
 Jeffrey Burds, "Sexual Violence in Europe in World War II, 1939-1945," Politics & Society 37 (March 2009): 47.
 Zav'ialov, Podzvezdami, 83; TsAMO, f. 1512 (233sd), op. 1, d. 93,11.197-98
 S. S. Biriuzovand Rade Hamovic eds., Beogradska Operacija (Belgrade, 1964), 124
 TsAMO f. 234, op. 2969, d. 28,11. 43–44, document reproduced in I.V. Bukharin and S. Stoianovich, eds, Otnosheniia Rossii (SSSR) s Iugoslaviei, 1941-1945gg: Dokumenty i material)/ (Moscow, 1998), 322–24.
 Filip Slaveski, The Soviet Occupation of Germany: Hunger, Mass Violence and the Struggle for Peace, 1945-1947 (Cambridge, Eng., 2013), 6; Anne Applebaum, Iron Curtain: The Crushing of Eastern Europe 1944-56 (London, 2012), 31; Beevor, The Fall, 468; Naimark, The Russians, 71; Merridale, Ivan's War, 323; Ungvary, The Siege, 356
 Dilas, Conversations, 88.
 Interview, Bratislav Filipovic, 13 March 2012, Belgrade.
 Mark Edele and Michael Geyer, "States of Exception: The Nazi-Soviet War as a System of Violence, 1939-1945," in Sheila Fitzpatrick and Michael Geyer, eds., Beyond Totalitarianism: Stalinism and Nazism Compared (Cambridge, Eng., 2009), 385-87
 A. G. Khorkov, Osvoboditelnaia missia sovetskikh vooruzhennykh sil na Balkanakh (Moscow, 1989), 179
 I.S. Anoshin, Na Pravyi boi (Moscow, 1988), 121. For escorting troops see TsAMO, f. 1512 (233sd), op. 1, d. 91,1. 201.
 N. I. lashchenko, "Druzhba, rozhdennaia v boiakh," recollections rduced in 73-ia gvardeiskaia: Sbornik vospominanii, dokumentov i materialov o boevom puti 73-i gvardeis- koi strelkovoi Stalingradsko-Dunaiskoi Krasnoznamennoi divizii, ed. A. K. Morozov et al. (Alma-Ata, 1986), 193. 71.
 Tolbuko, Baryshev and Chizh, Of Vidina do Belgrada, 203–04.
 BA, El'kinson Dnevnik, 9–10.
 Aleksandrov Nikolai Filippovich, interview by A. Petrovich, la pomniu, vospo- minaniia veteranov VOV, April 4, 2011
 Ivanov Mikhail Nikolaevich, interview by N. Choban, la pomniu, vospominaniia veteranov VOV, May 3, 2012
 For comparisons between Yugoslavia and heaven see Petr Mikhin, Guns against the Reich: Memoirs of a Soviet Artillery Officer on the Eastern Front (Mechanicsburg, 2011), 144;
 Shop Solomon Gershevich, interview by G. Koifman la pomniu, vospominaniia veteranov VOV, April 20, 2008.
 Nadezda Vdovina, "Secanje crvenoarmejke na oslobadanje Beograda," Vesti Online, May 9, 2013.
 Mikhin, Guns against the Reich, 174.
 Kerstin Bischl, "Telling Stories: Gender Relationships and Masculinity in the Red Army 1941-1945," in Maren Roger and Ruth Leiserowitz, eds, Women and Men at War: A gender Perspective on World War II and its Aftermath in Central and Eastern Europe (Osnabruck, 2012), 119.
 Roger D. Markwick and Euridice Charon Cardona, Soviet Women on the Frontline in the Second World War (Basingstoke, 2012), 79.
 Interview, Vera Protic, March 13, 2012, Belgrade.
 IAS, f. 83, "Mesnim narodnim odborima Pov. Br 145/45 dana 20.IX.1945."
 RGVA, f. 32900, op. 1, d. 341,1.108; For Zajecar, see IAZ, f. Sreski Narodni Odbor Zajecar godina 1944, k.2, "Sreski narodni odbor u Zajecaru dana 25 novembra 1944 godine doneo je sledece." Zajecar municipal authorities revoked the license from a local tavern owner for repeatedly violating the ban on the sale of alcohol to soldiers. I have found three separate attempts to impose similar restrictions in Subotica, the last order threatening repeat offenders to six months of forced labour, IAS, f.68, k.1521, "8 marta 1945 god. Gradskom Narodno Sslobidlackom Odboru grada Subotica. Od sefa odeljka narodne milicije, kapetan Stevanovic."
 Naimark, The Russians, 113.
 Susan Brownmiller, Against Our Will: Men, Women and Rape (New York, 1975), 64.
 Mary Louise Roberts, What Soldiers Do: Sex and the American GI in World War II France (Chicago, 2013), 7 and 95-96

References 

Serbia in World War II
Soviet World War II crimes
War crimes in Serbia
Crimes against women
Women in World War II
Wartime sexual violence
Aftermath of World War II
Rape in Serbia
Violence against women in Serbia